A joint, also commonly referred to as a  "doobie" or "doob", is a rolled cannabis cigarette. Unlike commercial tobacco cigarettes, the user ordinarily hand-rolls joints with rolling papers, though in some cases they are machine-rolled. Rolling papers are the most common rolling medium in industrialized countries; however, brown paper, cigarettes or beedies with the tobacco removed, receipts and paper napkin can also be used, particularly in developing countries.<ref>e.g., in Jamaica: The Rastafarians by Leonard E. Barrett p. 130.</ref> Modern papers are manufactured in a range of sizes from a wide variety of materials including rice, hemp, and flax, and are also available in liquorice and other flavoured varieties.

Joint size can vary, typically containing between  net weight of cannabis. Tobacco is sometimes used in the rolling process.

Variations and terminology

Although joints by definition contain cannabis, regional differences exist. In Europe, in certain Commonwealth nations, and more recently in North America, joints, or spliffs, typically include a cigarette filter or a bit of rolled thin cardboard in one end to serve as a mouthpiece, commonly referred to as the crutch, filter, or roach. 
The term "spliff" is sometimes used to distinguish a joint prepared with both cannabis and tobacco,
as is commonly done in European countries, where joints containing only cannabis are uncommon. In the West Indies where this term originated (especially Jamaica), a spliff is simply a marijuana cigarette, normally containing no tobacco.

Special vaporizers, made to look like joints, have also been designed for use with cannabis extract. 

Etymology and synonyms

The word joint ultimately originated from French, where it is an adjective meaning 'joined' (past participle of the verb joindre), derived in turn from Latin iunctus, past participle of iungere ('join'/'bind'/'yoke'). By 1821, 'joint' had become an Anglo-Irish term for an annexe, or a side-room 'joined' to a main room. By 1877, this had developed into U.S. slang for a 'place, building, establishment,' and especially to an opium den. Its first usage in the sense of 'marijuana cigarette' is dated to 1938.

Many slang terms are synonymous with the word joint''. 'Spliff' is a West Indian word of Jamaican English origin which has spread to several western countries, particularly the UK and  Europe. Its precise etymology is unknown, but it is attested as early as 1936. 'J' or 'jay' can be used as an abbreviation for a generic joint. Another frequently used term is 'doobie.' The end or butt of a mostly smoked joint is referred to as a "roach" in U.S. and Australian slang. Small metal clips to facilitate the smoking of a "roach" are called "roach clips". In the UK the term roach is commonly used to describe the cardboard mouthpiece. Roach clips cover a wide variety of paraphernalia including alligator clips, forceps, needle nose pliers, ceramic pieces with holes through them, and tweezers.

See also

Blunt (cannabis)
Cannabis smoking
Medical cannabis
Recreational drug use
Vaporizer (inhalation device)

References

Cannabis culture
Cannabis smoking
Marij